The Hope and Anchor is a Grade II listed public house at 20 Macbeth Street, Hammersmith, London.

It is on the Campaign for Real Ale's National Inventory of Historic Pub Interiors.

It was built in 1936 for Truman's Brewery, but the architect is not known. It is described by English Heritage as a "particularly fine and intact example of an inter-war pub in a Neo-Georgian style".

As of 2012, it is closed and available to let.

References

Pubs in the London Borough of Hammersmith and Fulham
Grade II listed pubs in London
Commercial buildings completed in 1936
Georgian Revival architecture in the United Kingdom
National Inventory Pubs
Hammersmith